Edward Bassenet D.D.  was a Welsh Anglican Dean.

Culme was born in Wales and appointed a Privy Counsellor by Henry VIII. He was Dean of St. Patrick's Cathedral Dublin from 1537 until 1547. He died before the restoration of the cathedral.

Notes

Deans of St. Patrick's Cathedral, Dublin
Welsh Anglicans